Minna-Monica Halonen (born 11 October 1975) is a Finnish retired ice hockey goaltender. As a member of the Finnish national team, she participated in the IIHF World Women's Championship tournament in 2001 and won a bronze medal at the 2004 tournament. She represented Finland in the women's ice hockey tournament at the 2002 Winter Olympics in Salt Lake City, serving as backup to starter Tuula Puputti.

The entirety of Halonen's club career was played in the Finnish Naisten SM-sarja with Kiekko-Espoo and Tappara Tampere.

Career statistics

International

See also 
 List of Olympic women's ice hockey players for Finland

References

External links 
 
 

1975 births
Living people
Finnish women's ice hockey goaltenders
Ice hockey players at the 2002 Winter Olympics
Kiekko-Espoo Naiset players
Olympic ice hockey players of Finland
Ice hockey people from Helsinki
Tappara Naiset players